Eando Binder is a pen name used by two mid-20th-century science fiction authors, Earl Andrew Binder (1904–1965) and his brother Otto Binder (1911–1974). The name is derived from their first initials (E and O Binder).

Under the Eando name, the Binders wrote some published science fiction, including stories featuring a heroic robot named Adam Link.  The first Adam Link story, published in 1939, is titled I, Robot.

By 1939, Otto had taken over all of the writing, leaving Earl to act as his literary agent. Under his own name, Otto wrote for the Captain Marvel line of comic books published by Fawcett Comics (1941–1953) and the Superman line for Detective Comics (1948–1969), as well as numerous other publishers, with credited stories numbering over 4400. The pen-name Eando Binder is also credited with over 160 comic book stories.

Otto Binder was born in Chicago and moved to New York in 1936. He worked as a literary agent for Otis Adelbert Kline for a year, then became a free-lance writer. He sold his first story in 1930 and 129 more during the next decade. He lived in Englewood, New Jersey, from 1944 until he moved to Chestertown in 1968. Otto Binder attended Crane College in Chicago and told Amazing Stories he was once "an amateur chemist with a home laboratory."

He wrote comic-book scripts, novels, and magazine articles. His books included Riddles of Astronomy, Careers in Space, and Mankind, Child of the Stars.

He was a member of the Journal of American Literature, the American Rocket Society, the American Interplanetary Society, the National Space Flight Association, and the Aerospace Writers Association.

He died October 14, 1974, and was survived by his wife, Ione; a brother, Jack, and two sisters, Marie Hackstock of Chicago and Teresa Samuelson of Estes Park, Colorado.

Earl Binder worked as a mechanical parts inspector for a "large industrial concern" during the 1930s.

Novels

 The Double Man
 The Impossible World
 Secret of the Red Spot
 Five Steps to Tomorrow
 The Cancer Machine
 The Three Eternals
 Where Eternity Ends
 Lords of Creation (1949)
 Enslaved Brains (1965)
 Menace of the Saucers (1969)
 Get Off My World (1971)
 Night of the Saucers (1971)
 Puzzle of the Space Pyramids (1971)
 The Mind from Outer Space (1972)

Bibliography

 The First Martian, Amazing Stories, Oct 1932
 Set your Course by the Stars, Astounding Stories, May 1935
 The Time Entity, Astounding Stories, Oct 1936
 Conquest of Life, Thrilling Wonder Stories, Aug 1937 (Anton York)
 Via Etherline, Thrilling Wonder Stories, Oct 1937 (Via)
 Life Eternal, Thrilling Wonder Stories, Feb 1938 (Anton York)
 Via Asteroid, Thrilling Wonder Stories, Feb 1938 (Via)
 Via Death, Thrilling Wonder Stories, Aug 1938 (Via)
 I, Robot, Amazing Stories, Jan 1939 (Adam Link)
 The Impossible World, Startling Stories, Mar 1939 (reprinted in The Impossible World)
 Where Eternity Ends (complete novel), Science Fiction, Jun 1939
 The Trial of Adam Link, Amazing Stories, Jul 1939 (Adam Link)
 The Man Who Saw Too Late, Fantastic Adventures, Sep 1939
 Lords of Creation, Argosy, Sep 1939, serialized in six parts, book publication 1949
 Via Venus, Thrilling Wonder Stories, Oct 1939 (Via)
 The Three Eternals, Thrilling Wonder Stories, Dec 1939 (Anton York)
 One Thousand Miles Below, Planet Stories, Winter 1940 (reprinted as Get off my World!)
 Adam Link in Business, Amazing Stories, Jan 1940 (Adam Link)
 Via Pyramid, Thrilling Wonder Stories, Jan 1940 (Via)
 Adam Link's Vengeance, Amazing Stories, Feb 1940 (Adam Link)
 Son of the Stars, Famous Fantastic Mysteries, Feb 1940
 Via Sun, Thrilling Wonder Stories, Mar 1940 (Via)
 Adam Link, Robot Detective, Amazing Stories, May 1940 (Adam Link)
 Adam Link, Champion Athlete, Amazing Stories, Jul 1940 (Adam Link)
 The Secret of Anton York, Thrilling Wonder Stories, Aug 1940 (Anton York)
 Via Mercury, Thrilling Wonder Stories, Oct 1940 (Via)
 Via Catacombs, Thrilling Wonder Stories, Nov 1940 (Via)
 Via Intelligence, Thrilling Wonder Stories, Dec 1940 (Via)
 The Teacher from Mars, Thrilling Wonder Stories, Feb 1941
 Wanderer of Little Land, Fantastic Adventures, Jun 1941 (Little People)
 Via Jupiter, Thrilling Wonder Stories, Feb 1942 (Via)
 Adam Link Saves the World, Amazing Stories, Apr 1942 (Adam Link)
 Enslaved Brains, Fantastic Story Quarterly, Winter 1951
 Iron Man, Future Science Fiction #28, 1955
 Captain Video, Fawcett, 1951
 Adam Link — Robot, Paperback Library, 1965 (Adam Link)
 Anton York, Immortal, Belmont, 1965 (Anton York)
 Puzzle of the Space Pyramids, Curtis, 1971 (reprinting the Via stories)
 Get off my world!, Curtis, 1971 (reprinting One Thousand Miles Below)
 All in Good Time, Signs and Wonders, ed. Roger Elwood, Revell, 1972
 The Mind from Outer Space, Curtis Books, 1972
 Any Resemblance to Magic, The Long Night of Waiting, ed. Roger Elwood, Aurora, 1974
 Better Dumb Than Dead, Journey to Another Star and Other Stories, ed. Roger Elwood, Lerner, 1974
 The Missing World, The Missing World and Other Stories, ed. Roger Elwood, Lerner, 1974
 The Avengers Battle The Earth-Wrecker, A Bantam Book, 1967

References

External links

The Internet Speculative Fiction Database has individual entries for Earl and Otto.
The Outer Limits Teleplay based on Eando Binders story I, Robot at imdb
Article at the SF Encyclopaedia
 
 
 
 

20th-century American novelists
American male novelists
American science fiction writers
Collective pseudonyms
Sibling duos
Writing duos
20th-century American male writers
Members of the American Rocket Society
Science fiction shared pseudonyms